Damayan Ngayon, also known as Damayan is a Philippine public service talk show program, and is one of the longest-running public service programs in the country. The first incarnation of the show was hosted by veteran actress and Philippine Red Cross member Rosa Rosal and William Thio, which first ran on ABS-CBN from October 20, 1969, until it closed down on September 21, 1972, as a telethon, and was revived on December 1, 1975, and aired on GTV (which later became MBS, NBN and PTV) until November 20, 2010, after merely 35 years. The second incarnation of the show premiered on PTV on October 6, 2017, and now airs every Fridays. It was hosted by Thio, and new host Emilie Katigbak.

History

ABS-CBN Era (1969–1972)
Rosa Rosal was a famous and devoted public servant. In the late 1960s, she organized a television program for outreach to the poor. Damayan premiered in October 1969 at its first home on ABS-CBN, Channel 2. Back then, it was the only public service program in the entire country. It began as a telethon to raise money to be donated for the victims of Typhoon Isang. Numerous stars participated in the program until it became popular and the show's run has been extended. The show ceased airing on September 22, 1972, after the closure of the network due to implementation of martial law.

Revival to Channel 4 (1975–2010)
During the martial law years, Rosal continued her public service work in the Red Cross, despite the government's increasing authoritarianism. She returned to the television industry and on December 1, 1975, she hosted the public service program Kapwa Ko Mahal Ko together with future Senator and Defense Secretary Orly Mercado and Dr. Antonio Tulasan, on GMA Network, wherein the show received great reception.

Rosal decided to revive her old show on GMA. Damayan once again premiered in the same year on GTV Channel 4 (which later became MBS, PTV and NBN) to provide humanitarian work through national television, together with her co-host William Thio.

Aside from providing public service in the show, Damayan discussed advancements in health, since Rosal often interviewed mostly doctors, and would even provide medical assistance on occasion. At the same time, Rosal hosted a drama anthology Ulila on government-owned network BBC-2 from 1976 to 1980, and Kapwa Ko Mahal Ko on GMA—these particular shows earned Rosal numerous citations such as the Ramon Magsaysay Award for Public Service in 1999, Order of the Golden Heart in 2006, and the Ading Fernando Lifetime Achievement Award in the 22nd PMPC Star Awards for TV.

Rosal's final telecast, life after Damayan (2010-2017)
After 35 continuous years on the airwaves, Rosal announced that she would be leaving the show. It ended on November 20, 2010. The executives of Channel 4 decided to not revive the show, out of respect for Rosal's audience.

Currently, Rosal still works in the Philippine Red Cross as its ambassador and a member of its official Board of Governors.

Revival as Damayan Ngayon (2017-2019)
After a 7-year hiatus, PTV 4 is set to revive the program as Damayan Ngayon, hosted by Emilie Katigbak and William Thio, beginning Friday, October 6, 2017, right after Sentro Balita.

Concept and legacy
Damayan featured mostly doctors and other personalities to discuss advancements in health and public service. It also hosted telethons to provide financial aid to those who are in need such as typhoon victims, those with no medical assistance and others.

Hosts
Final hosts
 William Thio (2007–2010, 2017–2019)
 Emilie Katigbak (2017–2019)
 Dexter Villamin (Tamang DEXarte) (2017–2019)
 Dr. Joseph Lee (Klinik On Air) (2019)

Former host
 Rosa Rosal (1969–1972; 1975–2010)
 Diane Querrer (Bayanihan Center) (2017–2018)

See also
 List of programs broadcast by ABS-CBN
 List of programs aired by People's Television Network

References

External links
 

ABS-CBN News and Current Affairs shows
1960s Philippine television series
1970s Philippine television series
1980s Philippine television series
1990s Philippine television series
2000s Philippine television series
2020s Philippine television series
1969 Philippine television series debuts
1972 Philippine television series endings
1975 Philippine television series debuts
2010 Philippine television series endings
2017 Philippine television series debuts
2020 Philippine television series endings
ABS-CBN original programming
People's Television Network original programming
Philippine television talk shows
Filipino-language television shows